The Central Bank of Nicaragua is the central bank of Nicaragua.

History 

The bank was established in 1960 and commenced operations on 1 January 1961.

Presidents
Francisco Laínez Matamoros, January 1961 - May 1968
Gustavo A. Guerrero, May 1968 - June 1969
Roberto Incer Barquero, August 1969 - July 1979
Arturo Cruz Porras, July 1979 - May 1980
Alfredo Alaniz Downing, May 1980 - June 1981
Alfredo César Aguirre, June 1981 - May 1982
Luis Enrique Figueroa, May 1982 - August 1985
Joaquín Cuadra Chamorro, August 1985 - April 1990
Francisco Mayorga, April 1990 - October 1990
Raúl Lacayo Solórzano, October 1990 - January 1992
Silvio De Franco Montalván, January 1992 - September 1992
José Evenor Taboada, October 1992 - January 1997
Noel Ramírez Sánchez, January 1997 - January 2002
Mario Alonso Icabalceta, January 2002 - May 2006
Mario Arana Sevilla, May 2006 - January 2007 
Antenor Rosales Bolaños, January 2007 - February 2012
Alberto Guevara Obregón, February 2012 - January 2014
Leonardo Ovidio Reyes Ramírez, January 2014 -
Source:

See also

 Banking in Nicaragua
 Nicaraguan córdoba

General:
 Economy of Nicaragua

References

External links
  Official site: Banco Central de Nicaragua

Nicaragua
Banks of Nicaragua
1960 establishments in Nicaragua
Banks established in 1960
Companies based in Managua